GABAA receptor-γ3, also known as GABRG3, is a protein which in humans is encoded by the GABRG3 gene.

Function 
GABRG3 is a subunit of the GABAA receptor for the neurotransmitter gamma-Aminobutyric acid (GABA).

Association with alcoholism 
Genetic markers near the GABRG3 gene are statistically linked to alcoholism.

See also
 GABAA receptor

References

Further reading

External links 
 

Ion channels